The 1999 Liga Indonesia Premier Division Final was a football match which was played on 9 April 1999 at Klabat Stadium in Manado. It was contested by Persebaya Surabaya and PSIS Semarang to determine the winner of the 1998–99 Liga Indonesia Premier Division. PSIS won the match 1–0 thanks to a late goal from Tugiyo. With the result, PSIS claim their first-ever professional title.

Road to the final

Match details

References

External links
Liga Indonesia Premier Division standings

1999